These railroads were bought, leased, or in other ways had their track come under ownership or lease by the Atlantic Coast Line Railroad.

The Atlantic Coast Line Railroad later merged with the Seaboard Air Line Railroad to form the Seaboard Coast Line Railroad.

The Georgia Railroad was partly owned by the ACL.

The ACL gained stock control of the Louisville and Nashville Railroad in 1902; see List of Louisville and Nashville Railroad precursors.

Atlanta, Birmingham and Coast Railroad
Atlanta, Birmingham and Atlantic Railway
Atlanta, Birmingham and Atlantic Railroad
Alabama Northern Railway
Alabama Terminal Railroad
Atlantic and Birmingham Railway
Tifton, Thomasville and Gulf Railway
Tifton and Northeastern Railroad
Atlantic and Birmingham Railroad
Waycross Air Line Railroad
Brunswick and Birmingham Railroad

Atlantic Coast Line Railroad of Virginia

Atlantic Coast Line Railroad of South Carolina

Central Railroad of South Carolina
Williamsburg Railroad

Cheraw and Darlington Railroad
Cheraw and Salisbury Railroad
Cheraw and Coalfields Railroad
Hartsville Railroad

Florence Railroad
No precursors

Manchester and Augusta Railroad
Charleston and Northern Railroad 
Charleston, Sumter and Northern Railroad
Eutawville Railroad
South and North Carolina Railroad
Bishopville Railroad

Northeastern Railroad
 No precursors

Wilmington, Columbia and Augusta Railroad
Columbia and Sumter Railroad
Wilmington and Carolina Railroad
Wilmington and Manchester Railroad
Wilmington Railway Bridge Company
Wilmington and Conway Railroad
Wilmington, Chadbourn and Conway Railroad 
Wilmington, Chadbourn and Conwayboro Railroad

Norfolk and Carolina Railroad
Chowan and Southern Railroad
Western Branch Railway

Richmond and Petersburg Railroad
Petersburg Railroad
Greenville and Roanoke Railroad
Petersburg and Western Railroad
Petersburg and Asylum Railway

Wilmington and Weldon Railroad
Albemarle and Raleigh Railroad
Seaboard and Raleigh Railroad
Williamston and Tarboro Railroad
Clinton and Warsaw Railroad
Clinton and Faison Railroad
Midland North Carolina Railway
Southeastern Railroad
Wilmington and Newbern Railroad
Wilmington, Newbern and Norfolk Railroad
East Carolina Land and Railway Company
Wilmington, Onslow and East Carolina Railroad
Wilmington and Raleigh Railroad
Halifax and Weldon Railroad

Bamberg, Ehrhardt and Walterboro Railroad

Charleston and Western Carolina Railway
Augusta Terminal Company
Port Royal and Augusta Railway
Port Royal Railroad
Port Royal and Western Carolina Railway
Augusta and Knoxville Railroad
Greenville and Laurens Railroad
Greenwood, Laurens and Spartanburg Railroad
Savannah Valley Railroad

Conway Coast and Western Railroad
Conway Seashore Railroad

Florida Central Railroad
 No precursors

Florida Midland Railway
 No precursors

Florida Southern Railroad
Florida Southern Railway
Gainesville, Ocala and Charlotte Harbor Railroad
St. Johns and Lake Eustis Railway (leased)
Yalaha and Western Railroad

Jacksonville and Southwestern Railroad

St. Johns and Lake Eustis Railroad
St. Johns and Lake Eustis Railway

Sanford and Everglades Railroad

Sanford and St. Petersburg Railway
Orange Belt Railway

Savannah, Florida and Western Railway
Abbeville Southern Railway
Alabama Midland Railway
Northwestern and Florida Railroad
Montgomery and Florida Railway
Montgomery Southern Railway
Albany and Gulf Railroad
Ashley River Railroad
Atlantic and Gulf Railroad
Pensacola and Georgia Railroad (only sold to Atlantic and Gulf Railroad from Live Oak, Florida to the Florida/Georgia state line)
Savannah, Albany and Gulf Railroad
Savannah and Albany Railroad
South Georgia and Florida Railroad
Brunswick and Western Railroad
Brunswick and Albany Railroad 
Brunswick and Florida Railroad
Charleston and Savannah Railway
Savannah and Charleston Railroad
Charleston and Savannah Railroad
Chattahoochee and East Pass Railway 
East Florida Railway 
Green Pond, Walterboro and Branchville Railroad
Greenpond, Walterboro and Branchville Railway
Walterboro and Western Railroad
Jacksonville and St. Johns River Railway
Jacksonville, Tampa and Key West Railway
Atlantic Coast, St. Johns and Indian River Railway (later sold to the Florida East Coast Railway)
DeLand and St. John's River Railroad
Orange Ridge, DeLand and Atlantic Railroad
Jupiter and Lake Worth Railroad
Palatka and Indian River Railway
Tampa, Peace Creek and St. Johns River Railroad
Live Oak and Rowland's Bluff Railroad
Live Oak, Tampa and Charlotte Harbor Railroad
Sanford and Lake Eustis Railroad
Silver Springs, Ocala and Gulf Railroad
South Florida Railroad
Sanford and Indian River Railroad
St. Cloud and Sugar Belt Railway 
Southwestern Alabama Railway
Tampa and Thonotosassa Railroad
Waycross and Florida Railroad

Winston and Bone Valley Railroad 
Winston Railroad and Lumber Company

Unknown
East Carolina Railway
Petersburg and Weldon Railroad

See also
List of Seaboard Air Line Railroad precursors

External links

 
Atlantic Coast Line Railroad precursors
Atlantic Coast Line